Leptostales oblinataria is a moth of the  family Geometridae. It is found in Florida, Puerto Rico, Jamaica and Guyana.

The wingspan is about 18 mm. Subspecies scintillans is more brownish-tinged than the nominate subspecies.

Subspecies
Leptostales oblinataria oblinataria
Leptostales oblinataria scintillans Warren, 1904

References

Moths described in 1890
Sterrhinae